The carved worm lizard (Monopeltis scalper) is a species of amphisbaenian in the family Amphisbaenidae. The species is endemic to the Democratic Republic of the Congo. There are two recognized subspecies.

Description
M. scalper is brownish dorsally, and it is whitish ventrally.

Reproduction
The mode of reproduction of M. scalper is unknown.

Subspecies
Two subspecies are recognized as being valid, including the nominotypical subspecies.
Monopeltis scalper gerardi 
Monopeltis scalper scalper 

Nota bene: A trinomial authority in parentheses indicates that the subspecies was originally described in a genus other than Monopeltis.

References

Further reading
Boulenger GA (1885). Catalogue of the Lizards in the British Museum (Natural History). Second Edition. Volume II. ... Amphisbænidæ. London: Trustees of the British Museum (Natural History). (Taylor and Francis, printers). xiii + 497 pp. + Plates I–XXIV. (Monopeltis scalper, new combination, pp. 457–458 + Plate XXIV, figures 4a–4d).
Boulenger GA (1913). "Description d'un Reptile Amphisbénide nouveau provenant du Katanga". Revue Zoologique Africaine, Brussels 2: 392–393. (Monopeltis gerardi, new species, pp. 392–393, illustration, three views of head). (in French).
Günther A (1876). "Notes on a small Collection brought by Lieut. L. Cameron, C.B., from Angola". Proceedings of the Zoological Society of London 1876: 678–679. (Phractogonus scalper, new species, pp. 678–679, illustration, three views of head).

Monopeltis
Endemic fauna of the Democratic Republic of the Congo
Reptiles of the Democratic Republic of the Congo
Reptiles described in 1876
Taxa named by Albert Günther